Iosif Varga (born 6 September 1934) is a Romanian rower. He competed in the men's coxless four event at the 1960 Summer Olympics.

References

1934 births
Living people
Romanian male rowers
Olympic rowers of Romania
Rowers at the 1960 Summer Olympics